Caucasus Airlines was a regional airline based in Georgia which served domestic destinations and countries in the region.

History 
The airline was established in 2001 and started operations in November 2002. The airline imposed a voluntary suspension of services in 2004 and ceased operations. Previously known as Silk Route Airways, the name was changed for legal reasons.

Fleet 
The Caucasus Airlines fleet included the following aircraft:
1 Embraer EMB 120 Brasilia

Caucasus Airlines operated 2 EMB-120 airplanes. Registration numbers 4L-XLA and 4L-XLF.

External links 
 

Defunct airlines of Georgia (country)
Airlines established in 2001
Airlines disestablished in 2004
2001 establishments in Georgia (country)
2004 disestablishments in Georgia (country)